Bombus (Mendacibombus) beskonakensis, formerly Oligoapis beskonakensis, is an extinct bumblebee from the Oligocene rocks of Beş Konak, Turkey.

References

Oligocene insects
Fossil taxa described in 2012
Insects described in 2012
Prehistoric insects of Europe